The Hanriot HD.17 was a French trainer seaplane of the 1920s. It was essentially a floatplane version of the ubiquitous HD.14 with a revised tail and a more powerful engine. Over 50 examples were operated by the Aéronautique Maritime, of which seven were converted to landplanes. A small number of HD.17s were exported to Estonia and Latvia. Further development resulted in the HD.41H.

Variants
HD.17
Floatplane trainer derived from the Hanriot HD.14
HD.41H
Further development of the HD.17 as a floatlane trainer.

Operators

French Navy

Latvian Navy

Specifications (HD.17)

See also

References

Further reading
 
 

1920s French military trainer aircraft
Floatplanes
Hanriot aircraft
Single-engined tractor aircraft
Biplanes
Aircraft first flown in 1923
Rotary-engined aircraft